Tony Savage (born July 7, 1967) is a former American football defensive tackle. Tony Savage was drafted by the New York Jets for the 112th pick in the 5th round.  He played for the San Diego Chargers in 1990 and 1992 and for the Cincinnati Bengals in 1992.

References

1967 births
Living people
American football defensive tackles
Washington State Cougars football players
San Diego Chargers players
Cincinnati Bengals players